A constitutional referendum was held in Niger on 24 September 1989. The new constitution would make the country a one-party state with the National Movement for the Development of Society as the sole legal party. The government would have a presidential system, as well as the continued involvement of the Armed Forces, which had ruled the country since the military coup in 1974.

It was approved by 99.3% of voters with a 94.9% turnout. The first elections under the new constitution were held later in the year on 12 December.

Results

References

1989 referendums
1989 in Niger
1989
Constitutional referendums in Niger